A2261-BCG (short for Abell 2261 Brightest Cluster Galaxy) is a huge elliptical galaxy in the cluster Abell 2261. One of the largest galaxies known, A2261-BCG is estimated to have a diameter of a million light-years, some 10 times larger than the Milky Way. It is the brightest and the most massive galaxy in the cluster, and has one of the largest galactic cores ever observed, spanning more than 10,000 light-years. Yet, unusually, its center does not contain a supermassive black hole.

The cD elliptical galaxy, located at least 3 billion light-years from Earth, is also well known as a radio source. Its core is highly populated by a dense number of old stars, but is mysteriously diffuse, giving it a large core.  On September 10, 2012, using Hubble Space Telescope's Wide Field Camera 3, scientists realized there was no supermassive black hole present in its center.

References

Elliptical galaxies
Hercules (constellation)
1981854